Spy is a 2015 American spy  action comedy film written and directed by Paul Feig. Starring Melissa McCarthy, Jason Statham, Rose Byrne, Miranda Hart, Bobby Cannavale, Allison Janney, and Jude Law, the film follows unorthodox secret agent Susan Cooper (McCarthy) as she tries to trace a stolen portable nuclear device.

Produced by Peter Chernin, Jenno Topping, Feig, and Jessie Henderson, Spy had its world premiere at South by Southwest on March 15, 2015, and was theatrically released in the United States on June 5, 2015, by 20th Century Fox. The film received positive reviews from critics and grossed $235 million worldwide against a $65 million budget. It was nominated for two Golden Globe Awards: Best Motion Picture – Musical or Comedy and Best Actress in a Motion Picture – Musical or Comedy for McCarthy.

Plot
Susan Cooper is a 40-year-old, single, desk-bound CIA employee who assists her partner, field agent Bradley Fine, remotely on a mission. Fine accidentally kills arms dealer Tihomir Boyanov, failing to learn the location of a suitcase nuke from him.

Susan uncovers evidence that Rayna, Boyanov's daughter, has contacted terrorist middle man Sergio De Luca, so Fine infiltrates her home. Rayna shoots him dead, while Susan watches helplessly online. Rayna then reveals she knows the identities of the agency's top agents, including Rick Ford and Karen Walker. Susan, once a top trainee agent but now unknown, volunteers to track her. When her boss, Elaine Crocker, reluctantly agrees, the ultra macho Ford quits in disgust.

With her best friend and colleague Nancy providing remote intelligence, Susan goes to Paris. Ford shows up and warns her she will fail because of her inexperience. She discovers that De Luca's office has burned down, but finds a photo of a man standing next to the fire. Ford appears, argues with Susan again and leaves. She sees the man from the photo switch Ford's backpack with one containing a bomb. Susan warns Ford in time during a Verka Serduchka concert and then pursues the man, accidentally killing him during the ensuing fight. She finds proof, on his body, that De Luca is going to Rome.

In Rome, Susan meets her contact Aldo. She follows De Luca into a casino, where she saves Rayna's life. She invites Susan into her inner circle, taking her by private jet to Budapest. In mid-flight, the steward kills Rayna's crew, but Susan subdues him. Rayna believes her to be a CIA agent, but Susan convinces her that she was hired by her father to protect her.

Nancy joins Susan in Budapest, using a code name of “Susan Cooper”. After being shot at, Susan pursues and catches the would-be assassin: Karen, who sold Rayna the names of the agents. She tries to shoot Susan, but an unseen sniper kills her. Susan, Nancy and Aldo accompany Rayna to a party to meet Rayna's contact, Lia. Nancy creates a diversion, jumping on guest performer 50 Cent, so that Susan can apprehend Lia, but Ford's inopportune intervention lets her escape. Susan catches her and, during a brutal fight, is saved from death by Fine, who faked his murder and is Rayna's lover and associate.

Rayna imprisons Susan and Aldo, but Fine visits them, revealing he is gaining Rayna's trust to locate the nuke, and he was the one who killed Karen. Susan and Aldo escape, and she follows Fine and Rayna to De Luca's mansion. There, she convinces them that the CIA has mistreated her, and she will do anything to protect Fine, admitting she loves him.
Terrorist Solsa Dudaev arrives, gives De Luca a suitcase full of diamonds, and Rayna produces the device. De Luca has Dudaev and his men killed, revealing his plan to resell the device to another buyer, then prepares to shoot Rayna. Ford distracts him, allowing Susan to kill his men.

De Luca escapes by helicopter with the device and the diamonds, but Susan grabs onto the landing gear. In the ensuing struggle, Susan throws the diamonds and the device into the lake below. De Luca attempts to shoot Susan, but Nancy, following in 50 Cent's helicopter, shoots him before he can. De Luca falls out of the helicopter into the lake.

The nuke is retrieved and Rayna is arrested, but she makes peace with Susan. Ford, realizing he had underestimated Susan, finally compliments her skills. Crocker tells her she will remain a field agent, and that her next assignment is in Prague. Fine invites Susan to dinner, but she opts for a night out with Nancy. The next morning, Susan wakes up in bed next to Ford and screams, while Ford claims she "loved it".

During the credits, details of Susan on various missions, all over the world, are shown.

Cast

 Melissa McCarthy as Susan Cooper
 Jason Statham as Rick Ford
 Rose Byrne as Rayna Boyanov
 Jude Law as Bradley Fine
 Miranda Hart as Nancy B. Artingstall
 Bobby Cannavale as Sergio De Luca
 Allison Janney as Elaine Crocker
 Peter Serafinowicz as Aldo
 Morena Baccarin as Karen Walker
 Björn Gustafsson as Anton
 Nargis Fakhri as Lia
 Richard Brake as Solsa Dudaev
 50 Cent as Himself
 Will Yun Lee as Timothy Cress
 Carlos Ponce as Matthew Wright
 Michael McDonald as Patrick
 Mitch Silpa as Fredrick
 Zach Woods as Man in purple tie
 Jessica Chaffin as Sharon
 Katie Dippold as Katherine
 Julian Miller as Nicola
 Sam Richardson as John
 Ben Falcone as American tourist
 Jamie Denbo as Casino hostess
 Steve Bannos as Alan, the bartender
 Verka Serduchka as himself
 Paul Feig as drunken guest at Paris hotel (uncredited)

Production

Development
On June 18, 2013, it was announced that Paul Feig was developing Susan Cooper, a female spy comedy, for 20th Century Fox. Feig wrote and directed the film. Peter Chernin and Jenno Topping produced the film under the Chernin Entertainment banner, with Feig and Jessie Henderson for Feigco Entertainment. On November 12, 2013, Fox announced a release date of May 22, 2015. On March 28, 2014, the film's title was changed to Spy.

Casting
On July 25, 2013, it was confirmed that Melissa McCarthy was in negotiations to play the title role. Zooey Deschanel was originally slated to play the role of Elaine Crocker but left the project. On October 17, Rose Byrne joined the cast of the film. Throughout 2014, Jason Statham, Jude Law, Nargis Fakhri, Miranda Hart, Bobby Cannavale,  Peter Serafinowicz, Björn Gustafsson. Morena Baccarin,  Allison Janney, Zach Woods and Jessica Chaffin joined the cast, along with 50 Cent, who would be playing himself, and Nia Long, who did not appear in the finished film.

Filming
Principal photography and production began on March 31, 2014, in Budapest, Hungary. On May 27, filming was under way in Budapest and was about to wrap up. Apart from tax breaks, shooting was primarily done in Budapest because its architecture and location could allow it to appear as other places where the story took place, including Paris. A prosthetic was used for shots of Nicola (Julian Miller) exposing himself. The production team of Spy had to present prosthetics used in the shots to the MPAA for rating.

Release

Theatrical
The US release of film was originally scheduled for May 22, 2015, by 20th Century Fox. In March 2015, the date was pushed back to June 5, 2015, which was first assigned to B.O.O.: Bureau of Otherworldly Operations and Paper Towns; the former of which being taken off the schedule and cancelled, while the latter moved to July. Prior to its official release, Paul Feig stated that Spy went through about 10 test screenings, a process – which includes recording the audience laughter for each version – he does "religiously", with Judd Apatow (who produced the Feig-directed Bridesmaids) commenting on its usefulness for a comedy film: "It doesn't work very well if a movie is supposed to make you feel difficult emotions. If you're making a David Lynch movie, it doesn't work at all. But for comedy it's often the best way to refine jokes."

Spy was released on May 21, 2015 in Australia, Malaysia and Vietnam, and of May 28, 2015 in Israel and May 29, 2015 in Norway.

Reception

Box office
Spy grossed $110.8 million in North America and $124.8 million in other territories for a worldwide total of $235.6 million, against a budget of $65 million.

In North America, the film made $1.5 million from its early Thursday night showings and an estimated $10.3 million on its opening day from 3,711 theaters, coming at second place at the box office behind fellow new release Insidious: Chapter 3. It would go on to top the box office in its opening weekend, earning $29 million. The film dropped 46% in its sophomore weekend to $15.6 million, finishing second behind newcomer Jurassic World.

Outside North America, Spy opened in ten foreign markets on May 22, 2015, earning $12.7 million in its opening weekend from 1,810 screens, and coming in fourth place at the box office (behind Mad Max: Fury Road, Tomorrowland, and Pitch Perfect 2). In the UK, Ireland and Malta, it opened with $3.9 million. The film had successful openings in South Korea ($4.8 million), Russia and the CIS ($3.1 million), Australia ($2.9 million), Mexico ($1.6 million) and Taiwan ($1.3 million).

Critical response
Spy received praise for Feig's direction and screenplay, McCarthy and Byrne's performances, as well as Statham's surprise comedic role. On review aggregator website Rotten Tomatoes the film has an approval rating of 95% based on 259 reviews, with an average rating of 7.30/10. The site's critical consensus reads, "Simultaneously broad and progressive, Spy offers further proof that Melissa McCarthy and writer-director Paul Feig bring out the best in one another — and delivers scores of belly laughs along the way." On Metacritic the film has a weighted average score of 75 out of 100, based on 40 critics, indicating "generally favorable reviews". In CinemaScore polls, audiences gave the film an average score of "B+" on an A+ to F scale.

McCarthy's performance was praised by critics. Richard Roeper of The Chicago Sun Times called her "as funny and as winning as anyone in the movies these days". Tom Russo of The Boston Globe credited the film's success to McCarthy, writing, "part of what makes the action comedy such a loopy blast is the identity shifts she pulls on the audience." Bill Goodykoontz of Arizona Republic called the film McCarthy's return to form, writing "Finally, after the promise shown in Bridesmaids, but sold short since by weak scripts in films like Tammy and Identity Thief, Melissa McCarthy gets a movie vehicle worthy of her talents."

In addition to McCarthy's, many of the supporting cast members' performances were praised, particularly Byrne's and Statham's. John Boone of Entertainment Tonight said Statham "twists his action hero persona into a delightfully delusional version of the same thing", and praised Byrne's performance, writing "For every joke that McCarthy's Susan Cooper ends up as the butt of, Byrne is the one teeing it up with perfectly understated wickedness. She can so easily spit out lines as offensive as, after Cooper delivers a punny cheers, "What a stupid, f**king toast," but make it...charming?" Peter Travers of Rolling Stone called Byrne's comedic timing "bitchy perfection".

Accolades

Possible sequel 
In a May 2015 interview with The Guardian, Paul Feig said he was already writing a sequel, that includes Jason Statham's Agent Ford, though the project doesn't have a producer. In 2019, Feig explained that although a sequel to Spy could still happen, "there hasn't been any interest from the studio" in the project.

References

External links

 
 
 
 
 

2015 films
2015 action comedy films
2010s spy comedy films
20th Century Fox films
TSG Entertainment films
American action comedy films
American spy comedy films
2010s English-language films
Films about the Central Intelligence Agency
Films directed by Paul Feig
Films produced by Peter Chernin
Films produced by Paul Feig
Films scored by Theodore Shapiro
Films set in Budapest
Films set in Bulgaria
Films set in Paris
Films set in Rome
Films set in Virginia
Films shot in Budapest
Films shot in Hungary
Films with screenplays by Paul Feig
American spy action films
Films about terrorism
Chernin Entertainment films
American female buddy films
Women spies in fiction
2010s female buddy films
2010s feminist films
2010s American films